James Broward Story  is an American diplomat serving as United States ambassador to Venezuela but located temporarily in the Venezuela Affairs Unit of the Department of State, located at the United States Embassy in Bogota, Colombia since 2018. Story was serving as the deputy chief of mission in Caracas until his superior, Todd Robinson, was expelled and U.S. diplomatic operations in Venezuela ended due to security and operational concerns. Before arriving in Venezuela, Story was serving as Consul General in Rio de Janeiro.

Career 
A career foreign service officer, Story has served in numerous postings throughout the world including Brazil, Mozambique, Mexico and Afghanistan. He also served as head of the Bureau of International Narcotics and Law Enforcement Affairs Office for the Western Hemisphere, and headed the bureau's office in Bogota. While in Afghanistan, Story served as the Senior Civilian for Task Force Rakkasan in Regional Command East Afghanistan.

On May 6, 2020, President Trump announced his intent to nominate Story to be the next United States Ambassador to Venezuela. On November 18, 2020, his nomination was confirmed in the United States Senate by voice vote.

Story grew up in Moncks Corner, South Carolina and graduated with a B.A./B.Sc. in interdisciplinary studies from South Carolina College at the University of South Carolina. He also received a M.Sc. from the School of Foreign Service of Georgetown University.

Story has a program called "Aló Embajador" that he broadcasts on social networks where he chats with different personalities, whether political or not, while answering questions from the audience.

Personal life
Story is fluent in Spanish and Portuguese.

References

1971 births
Living people
Ambassadors of the United States to Venezuela
American consuls
People from Moncks Corner, South Carolina
Walsh School of Foreign Service alumni
University of South Carolina alumni